Prisons in Pakistan and their administration, is a Provincial competency under the Constitution of Pakistan. Pakistan has the 23rd largest prison population in the world and the 5th largest death row population. Around 64.5% of prisoners are awaiting trial prisoners. 98.6% of prisoners are male, 1.7% are juveniles and  1.2% of those held are foreign citizens. As of 2018 Pakistan had an official occupancy capacity for 56,499 prisoners but held 80,145 prisoners.

Types of prisons 
The most common and standard jail institutions are Central Jails, District Jails and Sub Jails. The other types of jail establishments are Women Jails, Borstal Schools, Open Jails and Special Jails.

List of Prisons 
There are 99 operational prisons with an authorized capacity of 45,210 inmates. According to the Law and Justice Commission of Pakistan there are 80 169 prisoners.

Islamabad 
 Islamabad Jail Complex, under construction

Balochistan 
Prisons Department of Balochistan has following Jails:

Gilgit Baltistan 
Prisons in Gilgit Baltistan are under jurisdiction of Home and Prison Department.

Azad Jammu and Kashmir 
Prisons in Azad Jammu and Kashmir are under jurisdiction of AJK Prison Department.

Khyber Pakhtunkhwa  
Khyber Pakhtukhwa Prisons inspectorate is an attached department of Home and Tribal Affairs Department. The Inspectorate of Prisons supervises the operation and management of 22 prisons and 5 internment centers.

Punjab

Sindh 
Karachi Region
Central Prison Karachi
 District Prison Malir Karachi
 Central Prison for Women Karachi

Hyderabad Region
 Central Prison Hyderabad
 Special Prison Nara Hyderabad
 District Prison Badin
 District Prison Mirpurkhas
 District Prison Shaheed Benazirabad
 District Prison Sanghar
 District Prison Dadu
 Open Prison Badin

Sukkur Region
 Central Prison Sukkur
 Central Prison Larkana
 Central Prison Khairpur
 District Prison Sukkur
 District Prison Shikarpur
 District Prison Naushahroferoze
 District Prison Ghotki
 District Prison Jacobabad
 Special Prison for Women Larkana

Training

Federal 

The National Academy for Prisons Administration is the Federal Government's department for setting the standards of prison staff and is in charge of the training for all the prison staff in every provinces of Pakistan. It operates under Ministry of Interior. The academy is based in Lahore.

Sindh 
Government of Sindh runs a training institute at Sindh Prisons Staff Training Institute Nara Hyderabad.

Punjab 
Government of Punjab runs Punjab Prisons Staff Training Institute in Lahore.

See also

Prison officers ranks:
Inspector General of Prisons
Deputy Inspector General of Prisons
Assistant Inspector General of Prisons
Superintendent of Jail

Related:
Crime in Pakistan
Law enforcement in Pakistan

List:
List of prisons in Pakistan

References